Béatrice Pavy-Morançais (born 14 October 1958) is French politician.  She has been the vice-president of the Sarthe Departmental council, since 29 March 2015.
She represented Sarthe's 3rd constituency in the National Assembly of France from 2002 to 2012 as a member of the Union for a Popular Movement.

References

1958 births
Living people
Union for a Popular Movement politicians
Women members of the National Assembly (France)
Deputies of the 12th National Assembly of the French Fifth Republic
Deputies of the 13th National Assembly of the French Fifth Republic
21st-century French women politicians